Cordăreni is a commune in Botoșani County, Western Moldavia, Romania. It is composed of three villages: Cordăreni, Grivița and Slobozia (established in 2004).

References

Communes in Botoșani County
Localities in Western Moldavia